The NS 4000 was a series of express steam locomotives of the Dutch Railways from 1945 to 1956.

History 
After the occupation of the Netherlands by the German Wehrmacht, the NS had to surrender many of their locomotives to the Deutsche Reichsbahn. At the end of the war, the Germans took 466 of the 866 Dutch steam locomotives to Germany and 83% of the diesel and electric multiple units as well. The Dutch government in London therefore ordered new steam locomotives from Nydqvist & Holm AB (NOHAB) in neutral Sweden in 1942 to remedy the expected vehicle shortage at the end of the war. 15 express train locomotives with the wheel arrangement 2'C and 35 goods locomotives with the wheel arrangement D were ordered. The express locomotives were classified as the series NS 4000 and the goods locomotives as the series NS 4700. Although the NS had assumed that after the delivery of NS 6300 series was completed, they would no longer buy any steam locomotives.

Design 
The NS 4000 was an extremely modern three-cylinder locomotive by Dutch standards; all cylinders drove the first axle. The example of the 4000 ran on the Swedish private railway company Bergslagernas, they were derived from the type 'H3s'. For example, all axles ran on SKF roller bearings, the back of the streamlined cab was completely closed with folding bellows on the tender and the locomotives had electric lighting as well.

The tender was of the Gölsdorf type, and the two 4 wheeled bogies also ran on roller bearings. The tenders of the series NS 4000 and 4700 were identical. A new numbering scheme for steam locomotive tenders introduced in 1949 renumbered the series 4700 tenders to 4016–4050, creating a continuous, interchangeable series.

The locomotives looked very attractive with their small pointed smoke box door and large smoke deflectors, but this was not really useful when cleaning the smoke box or when changing the fire tubes. Over the years, the smokebox doors were replaced by larger ones, from scrapped Austerity locomotives of the NS 4300 and NS 5000 series. A bigger problem was that the locomotives had a steel inner firebox. It was therefore decided to replace these with copper ones, which was a costly investment, also because a few extra boilers had to be purchased from NOHAB, which were also fitted with steel inner fireboxes. After eleven locomotives had received a new copper inner firebox, the rebuilding was stopped. Nos. 4002, 4003, 4011 and 4015 still had a steel inner firebox.

Technical 
Compared to the previously predominant express steam locomotives of the NS 3700 and 3900 series, the NS 4000 series had many features that were new and unknown to the Dutch railway workers. Due to the northern temperatures, the locomotives had a completely enclosed cab. The cab windows was also something completely new in the Netherlands. The locomotives were designed as three cylinders, each powered by Walschaert's valve gear. The sandbox and steamdome shared a dome, also a feature of Swedish locomotives, as was the tender used, which was based on a design by Karl Gölsdorf. It was a very popular design and was widely used for kkStB locomotives. The conical and relatively small smokebox door was typical of Swedish designs.

The roller bearings were used on all axles, and the self-cleaning smokebox was very technically advanced in the Netherlands. All locomotives were factory fitted with smoke deflectors and steel fireboxes; the latter were replaced by a copper variant on eleven locomotives in 1952. The electric lighting of the engine, previously unknown to the NS, proved helpful in terms of entertainment. It caused the locomotives to be nicknamed "Christmas Trees".

NS service 
The first locomotive was delivered from Sweden via Denmark and Germany in March 1946 and arrived in Hengelo on March 17. On March 20, the first locomotive successfully completed the first test run. By the fall of 1946, all 4000 series locomotives had been delivered and put into service. They were first shedded in Amsterdam, then in Rotterdam - Feyenoord and Eindhoven, where they also had to pull goods trains in addition to express and passenger trains.

After the war, the NS accelerated the (re)electrification of the Dutch railway network, which was interrupted by the war, and in 1947 the locomotives of the series 4000 were moved to the depots in Zwolle and Amersfoort. In addition to the replacement by electric locomotives and multiple units, the locomotives weren't very popular with the Dutch railway personnel because of their often unknown controls. Whenever possible, the more popular "Jumbos" of the NS 3700 series were used. In Zwolle and Amersfoort, they initially ran express trains to Leeuwarden and Groningen. From 1948 all locomotives were allocated to Zwolle. In 1952 all the eligible lines in the east of the Netherlands were electrified. The locomotives were therefore brought back to Amsterdam from Zwolle. The local railway depot  used them for heavy express trains to Arnhem and the German border station Emmerich, including important trains such as the "Holland-Italy Express", which often had to be double-headed, and the Amsterdam part of the Rheingold. From January 1953 onwards it was possible to run electric locomotives and multiple units to Arnhem after that the NS 4000 series lost their place on these trains. They were withdrawn between 1954 and early 1956, the remaining locomotives were only used on goods trains and for special services.

Preservation 
Not a single locomotive of the NS 4000 has been preserved, but the Zuid-Limburgse Stoomtrein Maatschappij has two Swedish locomotives of the series B 1200 that were also built by Nydqvist & Holm (NOHAB) and somewhat resemble the NS 4000 series. In Sweden there are two locomotives of the sister series 'H3s' that have been preserved.

Furthermore, the tenders of locomotives 4003 and 4025 (4710) have been preserved, which were used in 1983 as a water wagon and used as a rail grinding train until 1983, which are now in the possession of Hoogovens Stoom IJmuiden, the upper part of tender 4025 (4710) has been placed and on the undercarriage of a generator wagon.

Gallery

Sources 

 R.C. Statius Muller, A.J. Veenendaal jr., H. Waldorp: De Nederlandse stoomlocomotieven. Uitg. De Alk, Alkmaar, 2005. 
 H. van Poll: Stoomtractie bij de Nederlandse Spoorwegen 1944 - 1958, Uitg. De Bataafse Leeuw, 1985. 
 H. Waldorp: Onze Nederlandse stoomlocomotieven in woord en beeld, (7e druk) uitgeverij De Alk, Alkmaar, 1986. ISBN 90-6013-947-X.
 Het Utrechts Archief

NOHAB locomotives
Rolling stock of the Netherlands
Steam locomotives of the Netherlands
4-6-0 locomotives